Nick Meaney (born 10 September 1997) is an Australian professional rugby league footballer who plays as a  and er for the Melbourne Storm  in the NRL. 

He previously played for the Newcastle Knights and Canterbury Bankstown Bulldogs in the National Rugby League.

Background
Meaney was born in Lismore, New South Wales, Australia. He is the grandson of former Manly Warringah Sea Eagles and Western Suburbs Magpies player Denis Meaney. Meaney was educated at St John's College, Woodlawn.

He played his junior rugby league for the Ballina Seagulls, before being signed by the Newcastle Knights.

Playing career

Early years
In 2016, Meaney played for the Newcastle Knights' NYC team, being named their NYC Player of the Year, before graduating to their Intrust Super Premiership NSW team in 2017. In May 2017, he was named 19th man for the New South Wales Residents in their clash against the Queensland Residents. Later that same month, he played for the New South Wales under-20s team against the Queensland under-20s team. At the end of the 2017 season, he was awarded the Knights' ISP NSW Player of the Year. In September 2017, he re-signed with the Knights on a 1-year contract until the end of 2018.

2018: Newcastle Knights
Meaney suffered an ankle injury in the first round of the Knights' Intrust Super Premiership NSW campaign, facing a lengthy recovery period, before returning in round 12. With new recruit Kalyn Ponga establishing himself as the Knights' first-choice fullback, Meaney signed a 3-year contract with the Canterbury-Bankstown Bulldogs starting in 2019, looking for a better opportunity to play first-grade. In round 18 of the 2018 NRL season, he made his NRL debut for the Knights against the Parramatta Eels, after a hamstring injury to Ponga. He went on to play 5 games in his debut year, scoring two tries and kicking one goal, his final game for the Knights, playing at fullback in his side's 14-24 loss against the St. George Illawarra Dragons in round 25.

2019 - 2021: Canterbury Bankstown Bulldogs
In round 25 of the 2019 NRL season, Meaney scored a hat-trick and kicked 5 goals as Canterbury defeated Brisbane 30-14 at ANZ Stadium in the last match of the season. Canterbury missed out on the finals finishing 12th on the table.

Meaney made 16 appearances for Canterbury in the 2020 NRL season and finished as the side's top point scorer.  The club finished in 15th place on the table, only avoiding the Wooden Spoon by for and against.
Midway through the 2021 NRL season, Meaney signed a contract to join Melbourne starting in the 2022 season. In the final round of the 2021 NRL season, Meaney scored two tries for Canterbury in a 38-0 victory over the Wests Tigers, in a season where the Bulldogs finished 16th..

2022 - present: Melbourne Storm

Meaney made his debut for the Storm in Round 1 of the 2022 NRL season, against Wests Tigers which ended in a win at Bankwest Stadium. He had his club debut jersey (cap number 218) presented to him by Melbourne Storm teammate Cameron Munster. Meaney would be named joint winner of the club's Best Back award for 2022, in a tie with Ryan Papenhuyzen.

References

External links

Canterbury Bulldogs profile
Newcastle Knights profile

1997 births
Living people
Australian rugby league players
Newcastle Knights players
Rugby league fullbacks
Rugby league players from Lismore, New South Wales
Canterbury-Bankstown Bulldogs players
Melbourne Storm players
Rugby league wingers
Rugby league five-eighths